The Ridge, in Ridgeville, Georgia, is an unincorporated community located along Georgia SR 99, approximately three miles northeast of Darien, Georgia, and was listed on the National Register of Historic Places in 1985.

The historic district embraces a community on a ridge overlooking salt marshes, on both sides of the Old Shell Road (Georgia State Route 99).  It includes two Italianate houses plus other residences with  Greek Revival, Eastlake, and Victorian Eclectic architecture.

References

Houses on the National Register of Historic Places in Georgia (U.S. state)
Victorian architecture in Georgia (U.S. state)
National Register of Historic Places in McIntosh County, Georgia